Harvey David Scott (October 18, 1818 – July 11, 1891) was an American lawyer and politician who served one term as a U.S. Representative from Indiana from 1855 to 1857.

Scott was the father of rhetorician Fred Newton Scott.

Biography 
Born near Ashtabula, Ohio, Scott attended the public schools and the Asbury (now De Pauw) University at Greencastle, Indiana.
He studied law.
He was admitted to the bar and commenced practice in Terre Haute, Indiana.
He held several local offices.

Congress 
Scott was elected as an Indiana People's Party candidate to the Thirty-fourth Congress (March 4, 1855 – March 3, 1857).

Later career and death 
He resumed the practice of law, serving as judge of the circuit court of Vigo County from 1881 to 1884.

He moved to California in 1887 and died in Pasadena on July 11, 1891. He was interred in Mountain View Cemetery.

Family 
Scott was the father of rhetorician Fred Newton Scott.

Notes

References

External links 
 

1818 births
1891 deaths
Politicians from Ashtabula, Ohio
Opposition Party members of the United States House of Representatives from Indiana
Politicians from Terre Haute, Indiana
19th-century American politicians
Members of the United States House of Representatives from Indiana